Peter Lyssiotis (born 1949, Cyprus) is a Cypriot born-Australian writer, photographer and photomonteur. In 2004 he received a commendation from the Anne Elder Award committee for his work. His small press books include Industrial Woman (with Vivienne Mehes and Jas H. Duke), Journey of a Wise Electron and Other Stories , Three Cheers for Civilization and The Harbour Breathes (with Anna Couani).

His photographs and limited edition artist's books, including the following have been purchased by private collectors, libraries and galleries throughout Australia, the US, Switzerland, France, The Netherlands and Cyprus.

 The Harmed Circle
 From The Secret Life of Statues
 The Products of Wealth
 Feather and Prey
 Desire & The Brush
 The Ifs of Language
 The Look of Love (with Scott McQuire)
 "1316 Book 1" (with Angela Cavalieri)
 "1316 Book 2" (with Angela Cavalieri)
 Homeland (with Noga Frieberg)
 A Gardener At Midnight - Travels in the Holyland
 The Use of Ashes (with Theo Strasser)
 Eye Witness (with Theo Strasser)
 Using Shadows (with Theo Strasser and Robert Colvin)
  First there is a Mountain
 The River (with Monica Oppen)
 Seven Rooms (with Monica Oppen)
 Men of Flowers (with Humphrey McQueen)

References

External links
 http://www.placegallery.com.au/2006/artists/peter_lyssiotis/Peter-Lyssiotis-06-CV.pdf
 https://web.archive.org/web/20070920223915/http://www.watsonplacegallery.com.au/2006/artists/peter_lyssiotis/peter_lyssiotis.htm
 https://archive.today/20060826102644/http://www.slv.vic.gov.au/programs/exhibitions/catalogues/lostandfound/lyssiotis.html

1949 births
Australian photographers
Australian poets
Cypriot emigrants to Australia
Living people